Sound.Color.Motion. is the debut album of the American rock band Farewell Flight, released in 2008. Recording of the album was commissioned through Mono Vs Stereo though the label folded before its intended release date. The band decided to move forward with the album's release independently, under their label The Easy Company.

Track listing

Personnel
 Luke Foley - Piano, Guitar, Vocals
 Marc Prokopchak - Drums
 Timmy Moslener - Guitar
 Robbe Reddinger - Bass guitar
 Mitch Dane - Producer
 Vance Powell - Engineer

External links
Sound.Color.Motion. on iTunes
Sound.Color.Motion. on Amazon

References

2008 albums